The Ring of Honour of the City of Vienna is a decoration awarded since 1925 to people who have made an outstanding contribution to the enhancement of the prestige of the city of Vienna through exceptional artistic or scientific achievements and found recognition beyond the borders of Austria. It is one of the highest distinctions of the city of Vienna.

History 
The ring of honour was established by the Bürgermeister Karl Seitz, as confirmed by the Vienna City Constitution (Wiener Stadtverfassung) of 1968. It was first awarded in 1925, although strictly defined criteria for the award were not laid down.

Description
In its present form, which dates from 1946, the golden ring is mounted with a shield-shaped onyx plaque edged in gold on which is depicted, as in the seal of Vienna, an eagle also in gold with the arms of Vienna in coloured enamel on an escutcheon on its breast. The shanks of the ring are decorated with golden laurel leaves. The inside of the ring bears a small gold plaque engraved with a dedication to the recipient.

Recipients of the Ehrenring up to 2004

References

Further reading 
 Handbuch der Stadt Wien. Wien: Verlag für Jugend und Volk 1935-2005
 Robert Linke: "Der Ehrenring der Stadt Wien". In: Zeitschrift der Österreichischen Gesellschaft für Ordenskunde, 102 (2016), pp. 1–20
 Walter Weinzettl: "Der Ehrenring der Stadt Wien". In: Handbuch der Stadt Wien. Band 52/53. Wien: Verlag für Jugend und Volk 1967/1968, p. 386
 Deutsche Goldschmiedezeitung. Fachzeitung für Juweliere, Gold- und Silberschmiede. Offizielles Organ des Zentralverbandes für das Juwelier-, Gold- und Silberschmiede-Handwerk 44 (1941), Heft 31

External links 
 Stadt Wien: WienGeschichteWiki - Ehrenring 

Vienna
Civil awards and decorations of Austria